The 16th National Spelling Bee was held in Washington, D.C. on May 28, 1940. Scripps-Howard would not sponsor the Bee until the next year.

The winner was 14-year-old girl Laurel Kuykendall, correctly spelling the word therapy. Elizabeth O'Keefe, a 13-year-old girl from New Jersey, took second place after failing to correctly spell "plantain", followed by Eleanor Shea of Nebraska in third.

There were 22 spellers this year, and the prizes were $500 for first, $200 for second, and $100 for third.

Harold F. Harding of George Washington University was the pronouncer. He earned a round of applause when he slipped and spelled the word "fore" himself, instead of waiting for the speller to do so.

References

Scripps National Spelling Bee competitions
1940 awards
1940 in education
Scripps National
May 1940 events